Casimiro Asumu Nze (born 4 March 1975) is an Equatoguinean sprinter. He competed in the men's 400 metres at the 1996 Summer Olympics.

References

1975 births
Living people
Athletes (track and field) at the 1996 Summer Olympics
Equatoguinean male sprinters
Olympic athletes of Equatorial Guinea
Place of birth missing (living people)